Frank Paur is an American television director of animated cartoons. He is best known for his work on Batman: The Animated Series, the Disney animated series Gargoyles, X-Men: Evolution, and The Avengers: Earth's Mightiest Heroes.

Marvel Animation
Paur is currently working with Lionsgate Studios and Marvel Animation on their line of animated films. He has directed The Invincible Iron Man, Doctor Strange and both Hulk Vs segments (Hulk vs Wolverine and Hulk vs Thor).

External links
 

Living people
Year of birth missing (living people)
American television directors
Place of birth missing (living people)